The year 1986 was the 15th year after the independence of Bangladesh. It was also the fifth year of the Government of Hussain Muhammad Ershad.

Incumbents

 President: Hussain Muhammad Ershad
 Prime Minister: Ataur Rahman Khan (until 9 July), Mizanur Rahman Chowdhury (starting 9 July)
 Chief Justice: F.K.M. Munim

Demography

Climate

Economy

Note: For the year 1986 average official exchange rate for BDT was 30.41 per US$.

Events
 1 January – President H. M. Ershad founded his own political party named Jatiya Party.
 14 April – Bangladesh Krira Shikkha Protishtan was inaugurated.
 14 April – Hailstones weighing  fall on Gopalganj District, Bangladesh, killing 92.
 7 May – The Third National Parliamentary Elections  were held. The result was a victory for the Jatiya Party, which won 153 of the 300 seats. Voter turnout was 61.1%. Bangladesh Nationalist Party, the winner of the previous elections, boycotted the election.
 25 May – 1986 Bangladesh maritime disaster, double-decked ferry Shamia capsizes in the Meghna River, southern Barisal, Bangladesh, killing at least 600.
 25 August – Shahjalal University of Science and Technology was established.
 15 October – Presidential elections were held. The result was a victory for Hussain Muhammad Ershad, who won 84.1% of the vote. Turnout was 54.9%.

Awards and Recognitions

International Recognition
 Bangladeshi diplomat Humayun Rashid Choudhury  was elected president of the 41st session of the UN General Assembly in 1986.

Independence Day Award

Ekushey Padak
 Alauddin Al Azad (literature)
 Al Mahmud (literature)
 Satyen Sen
 Askar Ibne Shaikh (literature)
 Munshi Raisuddin (music)
 Mobarak Hossain Khan (music)
 Dhir Ali Miah (music)

Sports

 Asian Games:
 Bangladesh participated in  the 1986 Asian Games held in Seoul, South Korea from 20 September to 5 October 1986. Mosharraf Hossain won bronze medal in boxing Light heavyweight (81 kg) event.
 Domestic football:
 Mohammedan SC won Dhaka League title while Abahani KC became runner-up.
 Abahani KC also won Bangladesh Federation Cup title.
 Cricket:
 Bangladesh participated in 1986 Asia Cup Held in Sri Lanka in March–April. On 31 March 1986, Bangladesh played their first One Day International against a full member of the ICC; Captained by Gazi Ashraf, Bangladesh were dismissed for 94 and Pakistan reached their target for victory with seven wickets in hand. They lost their second ODI, which was against Sri Lanka, finishing last in the three-team tournament.

Births
 15 January – Doli Akhter, swimmer
 4 February – Mahmudullah Riyad, cricketer
 20 May – Amaan Reza, actor
 27 June – Ziaul Faruq Apurba, actor
 20 October – Robiul Islam, cricketer
 5 December – Enamul Haque Jr, cricketer

Deaths
 28 June – Haji Mohammad Danesh, politician (b. 1900)
 22 December – Sarder Jayenuddin, author (b. 1918)

See also 
 1980s in Bangladesh
 Timeline of Bangladeshi history

References